Larry Bruce McGinnis (April 7, 1941 - April 5, 2014, Amarillo, TX), also known as L. B. McGinnis and Bruce McGinnis, was a writer, poet, and college professor. He was a professor of English at Amarillo College for 37 years.

McGinnis was the author of four novels: The Fence (1979), Sweet Cane (1981), Reflections in Dark Glass: The Life and Times of John Wesley Hardin (1996), and Dog Dreams (2007); and a non-fiction book about a saddle maker, Schweitzer.

McGinnis received the Amarillo College John F. Mead Faculty Excellence Award in 2000–2001.

References

External links

1941 births
2014 deaths
20th-century American novelists
21st-century American novelists
American male novelists
20th-century American male writers
21st-century American male writers